Tramway may refer to:
 Tramway (industrial), a lightly laid railway for uses such as logging or mining
 A tram transport system (public transport vehicles running on rails)
 The tracks which trams run on (also a section of reserved track for trams)
 Aerial tramway
 Tramway, North Carolina, locality in the United States
Tramway (arts centre), for visual and performing arts in Glasgow, Scotland
Tramway (film), a short film by Polish director Krzysztof Kieślowski